Marcel Poblome (1 February 1921 - 17 July 2009) was a French footballer.

Career
Born in Tourcoing, Poblome played club football for Excelsior AC Roubaix (1942 - 1943), É.F. Nancy-Lorraine (1943 - 1944), Excelsior AC Roubaix (1944 - 1945),  FC Nancy (1945 - 1948), Toulouse FC (1948 - 1950), AS Monaco (1950 - 1951) and Le Mans FC (1951 - 1952). With É.F. Nancy-Lorraine he won the Coupe de France in 1944 and was the Division 2 champion of France in 1946 with FC Nancy.

He died on July 17, 2009 at Gorcy, Meurthe-et-Moselle at the age of 88.

References

1921 births
2009 deaths
French footballers
AS Monaco FC players
FC Nancy players
Le Mans FC players
Sportspeople from Tourcoing
Association football forwards
Excelsior AC (France) players
Toulouse FC (1937) players
Footballers from Hauts-de-France